Volmoed is a settlement in Garden Route District Municipality in the Western Cape province of South Africa.

Volmoed is a small town in the Klein Karoo, about 15km from Oudtshoorn. It was formerly known as Armoed.

References

Populated places in the Oudtshoorn Local Municipality